Pleasant Township is a township in Pottawattamie County, Iowa, USA. According to the Office of the Census of the United States, the township has a total surface of 92.35 square kilometer. About 251 people live in Pleasant Township.  The population density is 2.72 inhabitants/km2.

History
Pleasant Township was established in 1873.

References

Townships in Pottawattamie County, Iowa
Townships in Iowa